Gerald T. Quinn (1940 – 18 October 2020) was an Irish Gaelic footballer who played at club level with Kilbride and at inter-county level with the Meath senior football team. He usually lined out as a forward.

Career

Quinn was a member of the Kilbride club team that earned promotion from junior to senior in the space of five seasons. After winning the respective Meath JFC and Meath IFC titles in 1960 and 1962, he won his first Meath SFC title in 1964. He won a second title in 1967 and then completed a three-in-a-row between 1969 and 1971. Having represented the Meath minor football team in 1958, Quinn won an All-Ireland Junior Championship title in 1962 before being picked for the senior team in 1964. He was one of the key figures on the team that won the Leinster Championship that year. Quinn was at full-forward for the All-Ireland final defeat by Galway. He was a member of the panel, alongside his brothers Jack and Martin, when Meath beat Cork in the 1967 All-Ireland final.

Death

Quinn died on 18 October 2020.

Honours

Kilbride
Meath Senior Football Championship: 1964, 1967, 1969, 1970, 1971
Meath Intermediate Football Championship: 1962
Meath Junior Football Championship: 1960

Meath
All-Ireland Senior Football Championship: 1967
Leinster Senior Football Championship: 1964, 1966, 1967
All-Ireland Junior Football Championship: 1962
Leinster Junior Football Championship: 1962

References

1940 births
2020 deaths
Kilbride Gaelic footballers
Meath inter-county Gaelic footballers
Winners of one All-Ireland medal (Gaelic football)